Michael Benjamin (June 27, 1981 – October 15, 2022), better known as Mikaben, was a Haitian singer, songwriter, and producer.

Life and career 
Michael Benjamin was born in Port-au-Prince, Haiti on 27 June 1981. He was the son of Haitian singer Lionel Benjamin. He began his career in 1999 in a Christmas contest televised special that was hosted every December called "Konkou Chante Nwel" where he won first place. Michael Benjamin was known as a producer, a singer, and a songwriter and dabbled in many Afro-Caribbean genres such as konpa, twoubadou, rap kreyol, soca, and reggae.

Death 
On the night of 15–16 October 2022, Benjamin died during a concert at the Accor Arena in Paris. He was 41 years old. He suffered a cardiac arrest on stage during his performance. Benjamin succumbed shortly after, despite rescue efforts.

References

External links 

 Mikaben on YouTube
 
 

1981 births
2022 deaths
People from Port-au-Prince
21st-century Haitian musicians
Haitian record producers
Musicians who died on stage